Mi hermano Esopo is a 1952 black and white Argentine film, directed by Luis Mottura with a script by Maria Luz Regás and Roberto Gil. It was premiered on 17 January 1952 and stars Mario Fortuna, Gregorio Cicarell, Pierina Dealessi and Susana Campos.

Synopsis
A young man must take the place of his ailing father in driving a carriage.

Cast
  Mario Fortuna
  Gregorio Cicarelli
  Pierina Dealessi
  Susana Campos
  Marcelino Ornat
  Diana Ingro
  Cayetano Biondo
  Ángel Walk
  Sara Olmos
  Inda Ledesma
  Juan Pecci
  José Nájera
  Serafín Paoli
  Arturo Vita
  Carlos Belluci
  Liana Noda

External links
 
 Información sobre Mi hermano Esopo (Historia de un Mateo) en el sitio del cine nacional

1952 films
1950s Spanish-language films
Argentine black-and-white films
Argentine drama films
1952 drama films
1950s Argentine films